Kostas Papageorgiou (1945 – 3 May 2021 in Athens) was an acclaimed Greek poet and critic.

He read Law and Philology and worked as a lawyer from 1972 to 1978. Since then, he is involved only in literature-related employment.

Papageorgiou died at the age of 76, on 3 May 2021.

Through the years he has contributed to almost all the major Greek literary periodicals   He has published reviews in newspapers, such Eleftherotypia and he used to publish a periodical titled Γράμματα και Τέχνες (Letters and Arts). Since 1982, he has been working for the Greek National Radio as a consultant in literary matters, and producer for cultural broadcastings.

Selected works

Poetry
Ποιήματα (Poems), 1966
Συλλογή (Collection), 1970
Το οικογενειακό δέντρο (The family tree), 1978
Το σκοτωμένο αίμα (Dead blood), 1982
Ποιήματα (1972-2000) (Poems 1972-2000), 2004

Prose
Των Αγίων Πάντων (All Saints), 1992
Άννα, τώρα κοιμήσου (Sleep now, Anna), 1995
Αντί σιωπής (Instead of silence), 2003

Essays
Η γενιά του '70  (Ιστορία, ποιητικές διαδρομές) (The Generation of the 1970s. History, poetic pathways), 1989
Τα άδεια γήπεδα (The empty pitches), 1994

References

External links
His entry for the 2001 Frankfurt Book Fair (Greek)
His page at the website of the Hellenic Authors' Society (Greek)

1945 births
2021 deaths
20th-century Greek poets
Greek male poets
20th-century Greek male writers
Writers from Athens